The Collins Waterfront Architectural District in Miami Beach, Florida, includes over 100 contributing properties roughly bounded by 24th Street, Pine Tree Drive, 44th Street, and Collins Avenue. Six architectural styles are found in the district, including Vernacular, Mediterranean Revival, Med-Deco (1920s European Moderne combined with Mediterranean Revival), Art Deco (including Streamline Moderne), Classical Revival - Art Deco, and Post War Modern. Architects responsible for work in the district include Martin L. Hampton, Russell Pancoast, Roy France, Albert Anis, Robert E. Collins, Henry Hohauser, Lawrence Murray Dixon, Harry O. Nelson, Victor H. Nellenbogen, Carlos B. Schoeppl, Melvin Grossman, Morris Lapidus, and Norman Giller.

The Collins Waterfront Historic District Designation Report prepared by the City of Miami Beach Planning Department (August 10, 2000) provides the following list of contributing properties located in the Collins Waterfront Architectural District. Authors of the report were Carolyn Klepser, William H. Cary, and Shannon (McCartt) Anderton.

The district was listed on the National Register of Historic Places November 15, 2011.

References

Collins Waterfront
Collins Waterfront
Collins Waterfront Architectural District